Tubal Claude Ryan (January 3, 1898 – September 11, 1982) was an American aviator born in Parsons, Kansas. Ryan was best known for founding several airlines and aviation factories.

Early years
Ryan began his flying career in 1917 when he enrolled in the American School of Aviation at Venice, California. After making his first solo flight, he was accepted into the Army Air Service with an under-age waiver. The day that he was to report, the armistice was signed, ending his prospects for a military flying career.  Instead, Ryan went to Oregon State College and studied Engineering, then was accepted into the Aeronautical Division of the U.S. Army (later known as the United States Army Air Corps). While in the Army, Ryan learned to fly at March Field, California, from where he graduated in 1921. Ryan flew forestry patrol duty until his enlistment ended in 1922.  Ryan then went to San Diego and sold barnstorming rides to pay for a military surplus Curtiss JN-4 Jenny.

Business career

Beginnings

Ryan's first employee was Hawley Bowlus, who had been the mechanic at the first flying school Ryan attended. One of his students was a wealthy young stock broker and real-estate developer named Benjamin Franklin Mahoney. Ryan sold half of the Ryan Flying Company to B. F. Mahoney on April 25, 1925. With Mahoney's funding, they bought the Douglas Cloudster, which Douglas had built for an attempt on the first non-stop transcontinental flight. A broken engine part grounded it in El Paso, Texas and by the time the repairs were completed, a pair of military pilots had accomplished the feat in a Fokker T-2.

Bowlus modified the Cloudster to carry 10 passengers. With the Ryan-Cloudster and three Ryan-Standards that Bowlus had modified to carry four passengers each, they founded The Los Angeles - San Diego Airlines. It began operations on March 1, 1925 ferrying passengers on a regular schedule between San Diego, California and Los Angeles, California.

Ryan Airlines

The company's first production aircraft was the Ryan M-1 monoplane mail plane, which flew in 1926.

The Ryan M-1's development was begun by William J. Waterhouse at Glendale, California's Grand Central Airport in 1924 with assistance from the Ryan Mechanics Monoplane Co., as the Waterhouse and Royer Cruzair. In 1925, Ryan purchased the incomplete project and a partial set of blueprints and Hawley Bowlus completed it in a San Diego waterfront cannery building, with substantial internal redesign. Ryan marketed it as the Ryan M-1, at one point displaying it on an elevated platform in San Diego, sporting a large banner saying "Built in San Diego". Jack Northrop, on 'moonlighting (weekend) loan' from his employer, Donald Douglas, substantially revised the M-1's design by designing a much stronger but easier to manufacture wing spar, more robust landing gear, and adding two parallel longitudinal wood slats along the side of the air-frame to help keep the fabric covering taut. This improved version was called the Ryan M-2.

Ryan sold his half interest in all three companies, the 'Ryan Flying Company', 'The Los Angeles - San Diego Airline', and 'Ryan Airlines' to his business partner, Benjamin Franklin "Frank" Mahoney on November 23, 1926, but remained on the payroll until the end of that year.

Ryan's role after this point is disputed, but it is known that he was not present for the planning and development of Charles Lindbergh's Spirit of St. Louis or the related Ryan Brougham, although they were enclosed and enlarged developments of the M-1.

The Ryan Aeronautical Corporation
Ryan used the money to buy the US distribution rights for the German Siemens-Halske Sh 12  radial engine. He took delivery of the first examples in December 1926 and mounted one on the Ryan M-2 he had received from Mahoney as a part of their agreement. In late January 1927, he began touring the country to drum up sales of the engines with the Siemens-Halske powered M-2, marketing them as the Ryan-Siemens 9.

Returning to San Diego that summer, he formed the T. C. Ryan Flying School and in October of that year, he formed the first Ryan Aeronautical Corporation to sell the engines.

Soon after, he was sued for using the Ryan name without the letters "T. C." attached to distinguish it from Mahoney-Ryan Aircraft Corporation, which had subsequently moved to Lambert-St. Louis Flying Field in Missouri, while his failure to manufacture the Siemens & Halske engines stateside forced the German-based Siemens & Halske company to buy him out in 1928. Ryan then took a hiatus, during which time little is known of his activities but Ryan may have been buying up new land created between Dutch Flats and the factory where the Spirit of St. Louis was built from material dredged from San Diego Harbor.

The "new" Ryan Aeronautical Corporation

In 1931, Ryan opened a flying school in San Diego, which he named the 'Ryan School of Aeronautics'. This company was one of many around the country that served the government's need for pilot training through the Civilian Pilot Training Program as they were increasing their readiness prior to World War II. Ryan decided to produce his own trainer aircraft, and returned to manufacturing. In 1932, he formed the 'new' Ryan Aeronautical Corporation, the second incarnation of the Ryan Aeronautical Company, which became known as "Ryan Aircraft". It was the fourth and last company to bear his name. The aircraft it was to manufacture took two years to complete, and in 1934 the S-T Sports Trainer flew for the first time. The ST was a very successful design which was widely used by civilian and military organizations worldwide and over 1500 were built.

The ST was followed by S-C Sports Coupe, with an enclosed side-by-side cabin, although this didn't sell as widely and only 13 were built before the war, and the focus on the ST ended production. Immediately prior to the start of the war, Ryan developed the YO-51 Dragonfly for observation and liaison, but were unable to interest the military who preferred the Stinson O-49 instead, and only built three.

Later, during World War II, Ryan developed the FR-1 Fireball mixed jet/piston power carrier-based fighter of which 71 were built, and one prototype for the improved XF2R-1 Dark Shark, which replaced the piston engine in the nose with a turboprop.

After the war, Ryan bought the North American Navion design and built it as the Ryan Navion. They also developed and produced the Firebee and related drones, which saw extensive use during the Vietnam War and for which they became well known.

They also developed a series of experimental vertical take off and landing aircraft exploring different ideas, including the X-13 Vertijet tailsitter, the VZ-3 Vertiplane, the XV-5 Vertifan and the XV-8 Flexible Wing Aerial Utility Vehicle although none of these led to a production aircraft.

Ryan sold Ryan Aeronautical to the Teledyne Corporation in 1969 which then rebranded as Teledyne-Ryan and which continued to produce a variety of pilotless drones as well as airframes for the AH-64 Apache helicopter. Despite there being no connection beyond T. Claude Ryan having founded both, Teledyne-Ryan continues to be claimed as the successor of the company that built the Spirit of St. Louis. Teledyne later sold off the drone division to Northrop Grumman.

Later years
After his retirement Ryan formed a new company with his son Jerome to develop and market the Ryan ST-100 Cloudster, a motor glider the elder Ryan had designed. The aircraft was type certified as both a light aircraft and powered glider, but Ryan died before production was commenced and only one was completed.

Ryan died September 11, 1982, in San Diego, California. His wife, Zeta Gladys Bowen Ryan, outlived him, but passed away in 1997.

Honors 
 1948 - Presidential Certificate of Merit, given by President Harry S. Truman in recognition of Ryan Aeronautical's contribution to the Allied war effort
 1958 - Horatio Alger Award
 1965 - International Aerospace Hall of Fame inductee
 1966 - Mr. San Diego, awarded annually by Civic Leaders of San Diego
 1970 - Fellow of the American Institute of Aeronautics and Astronautics
 1971 - Service to Aviation Award, awarded by the National Business Aircraft Show
 1974 - National Aviation Hall of Fame inductee
 1975 - Honorary Fellow of the Society of Experimental Test Pilots
 1981 - Aerospace Life Achievement Award, awarded by AIAA San Diego to a living aerospace pioneer with more than fifty years' experience advancing the frontiers of aeronautics
 1982 - Honorary Fellow of the American Institute of Aeronautics and Astronautics

References

Citations

Bibliography

 Bowers, Peter M. "The Many Splendid Spirits of St. Louis." Air Progress, Volume 20, No. 6, June 1967.
 Cassagneres, Ev. The Untold Story of the Spirit of St. Louis: From the Drawing Board to the Smithsonian. New Brighton, Minnesota: Flying Book International, 2002. .
 Hall, Nova. Spirit and Creator: The Mysterious Man Behind Lindbergh's Flight to Paris. Sheffield, Massachusetts:  Safe Goods Publishing, 2003. .
  Sprekelmeyer, Linda, editor. These We Honor: The International Aerospace Hall of Fame. Donning Co. Publishers, 2006. .

External links
Aerospace Memorial Biography
Horatio Alger Association Membership Profile

 

Aviators from California
Aviators from Kansas
People from Parsons, Kansas
Businesspeople from San Diego
History of San Diego
1898 births
1982 deaths
American people of Irish descent
American aerospace engineers
Engineers from California
20th-century American engineers
20th-century American businesspeople